The Bell 525 Relentless is an American super-medium-lift helicopter, under development by Bell Textron. The Bell 525 was unveiled at the 2012 Heli-Expo in Dallas, Texas in February 2012. The helicopter first flew on 1 July 2015. It is designed to transport up to 19 passengers.

Development
The Bell 525's maiden flight was planned for late 2014. PHI, Inc. was the launch customer for the type, but as of 2016 is no longer the launch customer. After a six-month delay, the Bell 525 prototype first flew in July 2015. At that time, Bell predicted certification to be completed by the end of 2017. The FAA suggested special rules in May 2016, to address the fly-by-wire concept.

July 2016 crash

At approximately 11:48 AM Central Daylight Time on July 6, 2016, the prototype crashed during a test flight near Italy, Texas, killing the two occupants.

The crash delayed certification from 2017 to 2018. In February 2018, Bell predicted certification to be completed by late 2018 or early 2019. In December 2018, 1,300 hours of turn time and 900 hr of flight were accumulated, towards a 2019 US type certification. In early 2019, two helicopters will be tested in cold weather in Yellowknife, Northwest Territories, Canada, as a third prototype will validate performance in snowy north continental US.

Intended market
Bell is pitching the Bell 525 to military customers as a 20-passenger utility and troop transport or search and rescue (SAR) aircraft.

Bell sought to sell the 525 to the United Kingdom for its New Medium Helicopter program, which aims to replace the RAF's Puma helicopters, but Bell's proposal did not make it past the pre-qualification questionnaire stage.

Design
The Bell 525 is designed to meet a requirement for a medium-lift helicopter. It will be constructed primarily from composites and metal and is to be the first commercial helicopter to incorporate fly-by-wire flight controls, with tactile cues. The system is triple redundant, and is developed in two simulator environments. The 525 is powered by a pair of GE CT7-2F1 turboshaft engines, with a new composite five-blade main rotor system. The cost of the 525 has not yet been determined, but it is expected to be cost competitive on missions between 50 and 400 nmi, performed by helicopters such as the AgustaWestland AW139 and Sikorsky S-92.

The Bell 525 is designed to fit the emerging "Super-Medium" size category suited ideally to support offshore oil and gas operations. Half of the customers come from that sector. Helicopters under development in the same class are the Airbus Helicopters H175 and the AgustaWestland AW189. The 525 is to be certified in Category A Takeoff class, at maximum gross weight. This involves being able to continue a takeoff (or landing) after one of the helicopter's two turbine engines fails at any point. It should be capable of carrying 19 passengers, more than any existing super-medium helicopter. It is designed for two pilots with 16 passengers in the standard configuration and two pilots with 20 passengers in high-density seating.

Specifications (Bell 525)

See also

References

External links

Bell 525 Web site
 ANALYSIS: Bell 525 Relentless cutaway and technical description
 Cutaway drawing of 525
 
 

Aircraft first flown in 2015
525 Relentless
Twin-turbine helicopters
2010s United States civil utility aircraft
2010s United States helicopters